This is a survey of the postage stamps and postal history of the Netherlands East Indies, otherwise known as the Dutch East Indies, and which today is known as Indonesia.

First stamps
The first postage stamp in the Dutch East Indies was printed in Utrecht, the Netherlands, on 1 April 1864. The stamp showed a picture of King Willem III of the Netherlands and had a face value of ten cents. It was designed by T W Kaiser. Until 1920, stamp designs only showed pictures of the King and Queen and were primarily shown using typographic design. Stamps issued in later years began to show the culture and geography of the Indonesian archipelago. During the Dutch East Indies period, the stamps were printed in the Netherlands by the firm of Joh. Enschedé & Zoner of Haarlem, and some printing was done in Batavia (Jakarta) by Reproductiebedrijf Topografische Dienst. The stamps were mostly printed in one or two colors.

Netherlands New Guinea
From 1950 to 1962, stamps were issued as the renamed Nederlands Nieuw Guinea. Netherlands New Guinea came under temporary United Nations administration from 1 October 1962 to 1 May 1963 when stamps were overprinted “UNTEA”.

On 1 May 1963, the area became the Indonesian province of West Irian (Irian Barat) and issued its own stamps until 1973 since when Indonesian stamps have been used.

See also 
 Postage stamps and postal history of Indonesia
 Postage stamps and postal history of the Netherlands
 Postage stamps and postal history of Western New Guinea

References

Further reading 
 Boissevain, Charles F.C.G. and Leo B. Vosse. Zijn stempel gedrukt = The stamp of authority: C.D. Ricardo en zihn filatelistische collectie over Nederlands-Indie en Indonesie gedurende 1942-1949 = C.D. Ricardo and his philatelic collection on the Dutch East Indies and Indonesia from 1942-1949. Den Haag: SeaPress: Het Nederlandse PTT Museum, 1997  118p.
 Bulterman P. R. Poststempels Nederlands-Indie 1864-1950. Blaricum: The Author, 1981 579p.
 Dai Nippon, Catalogue of the postage stamps of the Netherlands East Indies under Japanese occupation 1942-1945, 2001.
 Houwink, Roel H. Die Briefmarken von Niederlandisch-Neuguinea. Frankfurt am Main: Arbeitsgemeinschaft Neues Handbuch der Briefmarkenkunde e.V. im Bund Deutscher Philatelisten e.V., 1963 19p.

External links

 Website of Dai Nippon, philatelic society specializing in the Japanese occupation, and the Republic of Indonesia (1945-1949)
 East Indies stamps (1864-1948)

Postal system of Indonesia
Philately of the Netherlands
Philately of Indonesia